The city of Ottawa, Canada held municipal elections on December 3, 1928 to elect members of the 1929 Ottawa City Council.

Mayor of Ottawa
Incumbent mayor Arthur Ellis was re-elected without opposition.

Plebiscites
Property owners voted in favour of improving water supply in the city which would involve allowing the city to spend $1,315,000 for a water filtration system. 

City residents voted in favour to continue using daylight saving time in the city.

Ottawa Board of Control
(4 elected)

Ottawa City Council
(2 elected from each ward)

References
Ottawa Citizen, December 4, 1928; ppg 1, 14-16]

Municipal elections in Ottawa
1928 elections in Canada
1920s in Ottawa
1928 in Ontario